Deportes Progreseño was a Honduran football club, based in El Progreso, Honduras.  The club played in the Honduran Liga Nacional for two seasons from 1993 to 1995.

History
Deportes Progreseño obtained promotion to Liga Nacional on 28 March 1993 as winners of the 1992–93 Honduran Segunda División.  They became the second team to represent the city of El Progreso after C.D. Honduras Progreso in the top division.  They spent two years in the top division, however, they were unable to obtain good results and fell back to Segunda División short after.

Achievements
Segunda División
Winners (1): 1992–93

League performance

References

Football clubs in Honduras
Football clubs in El Progreso